In molecular biology, the group I pyridoxal-dependent decarboxylases, also known as glycine cleavage system P-proteins, are a family of enzymes consisting of glycine cleavage system P-proteins (glycine dehydrogenase (decarboxylating))  from bacterial, mammalian and plant sources. The P protein is part of the glycine decarboxylase multienzyme complex (GDC) also annotated as glycine cleavage system or glycine synthase. The P protein binds the alpha-amino group of glycine through its pyridoxal phosphate cofactor, carbon dioxide is released and the remaining methylamin moiety is then transferred to the lipoamide cofactor of the H protein. GDC consists of four proteins P, H, L and T.

Pyridoxal-5'-phosphate-dependent amino acid decarboxylases can be divided into four groups based on amino acid sequence. Group I comprises glycine decarboxylases.

See also
Group II pyridoxal-dependent decarboxylases
Group III pyridoxal-dependent decarboxylases
Group IV pyridoxal-dependent decarboxylases

References

Protein families